覃 is a Chinese surname that can be pronounced in Mandarin as Tán or Qín, with the latter being common among Zhuang people. A 2013 study found it to be the 96th most common surname, shared by 2,400,000 people or 0.180% of the population, with the province-level unit with the most being the Guangxi Zhuang Autonomous Region.

Tangya Tusi City is located in Tangya Town, Xianfeng County, Hubei Province, China. As the capital, the site was built in 1355 (late Yuan dynasty) and abandoned in 1755 (Qing dynasty).

Notable people

Qin
 Qin Yingji (覃应机; 1915–1992) a People's Republic of China politician from Guangxi
 Qin Qian (覃茜; born 1964) is a Chinese musician who performs on the erhu. Qin was born in Guangxi, China
 Esther Qin (覃帆; born 1991) is an ethnic Zhuang Chinese-born Australian diver
 Qin Zhen (覃振; 1885 – 18 April 1947) was a Chinese politician from Taoyuan County, Hunan

Tan
 Thum Ping Tjin (覃炳鑫) (born 1979), also known as PJ Thum, is a Singaporean former national swimmer

References

Individual Chinese surnames
Chinese-language surnames not found in the Hundred Family Surnames